Dion Myles (born 2 May 1976) is a former Australian rules footballer who played in the Australian Football League (AFL) for the Sydney Swans between 1995 and 1997.

Myles played eight games and kicked one goal for Sydney, debuting against Brisbane in round 18, 1995 and playing his final game against Carlton in round 21, 1997.

Miles went on to play with West Adelaide in the South Australian National Football League (SANFL), helping them to a 3rd-place finish in 1998 and going on to win the club's Best & Fairest award in 2000.

External links 
 Footywire
 
 

1976 births
Living people
Sydney Swans players
Australian rules footballers from New South Wales
East Coast Eagles players